The Battle of Fisher's Hill was fought September 21–22, 1864, near Strasburg, Virginia, as part of the Valley Campaigns of 1864 during the American Civil War. Despite its strong defensive position, the Confederate army of Lt. Gen. Jubal Early was defeated by the Union Army of the Shenandoah, commanded by Maj. Gen. Philip Sheridan.

Background

Military situation

Sheridan had almost 35,000 men in the Shenandoah Valley opposing Early, with just under 10,000. Early, following the Third Battle of Winchester took a strong position. His right rested on the North Branch of the Shenandoah River. The left flank of his infantry was on Fisher's Hill. Confederate cavalry was expected to hold the ground from there to Little North Mountain. Maj. Gen. George Crook advised Sheridan to flank this position. His command was assigned to move along the wooded slopes of the mountain to attack the cavalry.

Opposing forces

Union

Confederate

Battle

Crook's attack began about 4 p.m. on September 22, 1864. The infantry attack pushed the Confederate troopers out of their way. Maj. Gen. Stephen Dodson Ramseur tried refusing the left flank of his division. Crook and Brig. Gen. James B. Ricketts's division, of Horatio G. Wright's VI Corps struck Ramseur's line, pushing it in. Wright's remaining divisions and XIX Corps broke the Southern line.

Aftermath
The Confederates fell back to Waynesboro, Virginia. Brig. Gen. Alfred Torbert was sent into the Luray Valley with 6,000 cavalrymen to force his way through the 1,200 Confederate cavalrymen under Brigadier General Williams Wickham. Torbert was then supposed to move through the New Market and Luray Gap in Massanutten Mountain and come up behind Early and cut-off his retreat at Fisher's Hill. Torbert fell back after making a token effort against Wickham's force at Milford (present day Overall) and Early escaped.

Four Union Army enlisted men and one officer received the Medal of Honor in the action at Fisher's Hill.

 Private James Connors, 43rd New York Infantry
 Private John Creed, 23rd Illinois Infantry
 Private George G. Moore, 11th West Virginia Infantry
 Sergeant Sylvester D. Rhodes, 61st Pennsylvania Infantry
 First Lieutenant Edward N. Whittier, 5th Battery Maine Light Artillery

Battlefield preservation

The Civil War Trust (a division of the American Battlefield Trust) and its partners have acquired and preserved  of the battlefield. The preserved portion of the battlefield is marked by trails and interpretive signs.

See also

 Troop engagements of the American Civil War, 1864
 List of costliest American Civil War land battles
 List of American Civil War battles
Army of West Virginia
Jackson's Valley Campaign

Notes

References
 National Park Service battle description
 CWSAC Report Update and Resurvey: Individual Battlefield Profiles

Memoirs and primary sources
Early, Jubal A. A Memoir of the Last Year of the War for Independence in the Confederate States of America. Edited by Gary W. Gallagher. Columbia: University of South Carolina Press, 2001. .
 Sheridan, Philip Henry. Personal Memoirs of P. H. Sheridan, General, United States Army in Two Volumes, Vol. II. New York, New York: Charles L. Webster & Company, 1888.
 U.S. War Department, The War of the Rebellion: a Compilation of the Official Records of the Union and Confederate Armies. Washington, DC: U.S. Government Printing Office, 1880–1901.

External links
 

Battle of Fisher's Hill
Fisher's Hill 1864
Battles of the Eastern Theater of the American Civil War
Union victories of the American Civil War
Fisher's Hill
Battle of Fisher's Hill
Conflicts in 1864
September 1864 events